Amphiporidae is a family of ribbonworms belonging to the order Hoplonemertea.

Genera
The following genera are recognised:
 Aegialonemertes Gibson, 1990
 Alaonemertes Stiasny-Wijnhoff, 1942
 Alaxinus Gibson, Wickham & Kuris, 1990
Amphipora Schulz, 1883
Amphiporella Friedrich, 1940
Amphiporus Ehrenberg, 1831
Arctonemertes Friedrich, 1957
Clathrodictyella Bogoyavlenskaya, 1965
Clavidictyon Sugiyama, 1939
Communoporus Friedrich, 1957
Correanemertes Kirsteuer, 1967
Crybelonemertes Sundberg & Gibson, 1995
Dananemertes Friedrich, 1957
Diopsonemertes Kajihara, Gibson & Mawatari, 2001
Duosnemertes Friedrich, 1955
Euryamphipora Klovan, 1966
Furugelmina Chernyshev, 1998
Gurjanovella Uschakov, 1926
Naredopsis Verrill, 1892
Nemertovema Chernyshev & Polyakova, 2018
Noteonemertes Gibson, 2002
Novitella Bogoyavlevskaya, 1984
Omatoplea Diesing, 1850
Ommatoplea Ehrenberg, 1831
Parischyronemertes Gibson, 2002
Pheroneonemertes Gibson, 1990
Poseidonemertes Kirsteuer, 1967
Proamphiporus Chernyshev & Polyakova, 2019
Proneurotes Montgomery, 1897
Psammamphiporus Gibson, 1989
Stellopora Bogoyavlenskaya, 1972
Thallassionemertes Gibson & Sundberg, 2001
Vacuustroma Hung & Mistiaen, 1997
Valdivianemertes Grube, 1840
Vulcanonemertes Gibson & Strand, 2002
Zygonemertes Burger, 1895
Zygonemertes Montgomery, 1897
Additionally, it contains the following unranked taxa: 

 BOLD:AAP2669 (Amphiporidae sp.)
 BOLD:AAP2671 (Amphiporidae sp.)
 BOLD:ACQ1696 (Amphiporidae sp.)
 BOLD:ADW6606 (Amphiporidae sp.)
 BOLD:ADW6607 (Amphiporidae sp.)
 BOLD:ADW6608 (Amphiporidae sp.)

References

Monostilifera
Nemertea families